Gopi (Nepali:गोपी) is an 2019 drama film, directed by Dipendra Lama. The film is written by Samipya Raj Timalsena and produced by Aarohi K.C. made under the banner of Aarohi Entertainment. The film stars Bipin Karki, Barsha Raut and Surakshya Panta in the lead roles. The film is about a man named Gopi who struggles to pursue his dreams.

The film was released on 1 February 2019.

Plot 
Gopi (Bipin Karki) is a lecturer in local college. Simultaneously he runs a cow farm. His father has a dream to settle down in US. For this, Gopi has to apply first, but Gopi wants to stay in Nepal. He gives continuity to his milk business.

Cast 

 Bipin Karki as Gopi
 Barsha Raut
 Surakshya Panta

Production 
Khagendra Lamichhane was set for the lead role in the film but he would drop out of the project. The lead actress Barsha Siwakoti would drop the project. Bipin Karki and Barsha Raut replaced Lamichhane and Siwakoti. Photography for the Gopi begun in August 2018. Most of the scenes of the film were shot in Tokha, Kathmandu. Few scenes were shot in Patalekhet, Kavre.

Soundtrack

Awards

References

External links 

 

2019 drama films
2019 films
Films about cattle
Films about farmers
Films set on farms
Films set in Nepal
2010s Nepali-language films
Nepalese drama films